The Turkey Open originally known as the Turkey International Championships also known as the Istanbul International Championships  is a defunct tennis tournament that was played on outdoor Clay courts, Istanbul, Turkey. The event was part of the men's amateur tennis tour (1947-1967) with the advent of the Open Era it was part of the non-aligned tour circuit of the ITF, between 1968 and 1973. In 1975 the final year it was staged it became part of the Grand Prix tennis circuit.

History
The Turkey Open was originally established on 25 August 1947  as the Turkey International Championships and also called the Istanbul International Championships until 1967. From 1968 until 1973 the event was part of the ITF independent tour and was known as the Turkey Open no event was staged in 1974 however in its final year 1975 it was very briefly apart of the men's Grand Prix tennis circuit. The event was played on outdoor clay courts. The tournament featured both singles and doubles play.

Past finals
Past singles champions have included:

Men's singles

Doubles

See also
 Istanbul Open

References

Sources
 https://app.thetennisbase.com/Turkey Open: Tournament Roll of Honour
 Singles Draw
 Doubles Draw
 ITF Archives

Further reading
 Bud Collins, History of Tennis: An Authoritative Encyclopedia and Record Book, New Chapter Press, USA, 2nd Edition, 2010.  . Accessed 10/11/2017.

External links

Tennis tournaments in Turkey
Grand Prix tennis circuit
Defunct tennis tournaments in Europe
Defunct sports competitions in Turkey
Clay court tennis tournaments